Communications training or communication skills training refers to various types of training to develop necessary skills for  communication. Effective communication is vital for the success in various situations. Individuals undergo communications training to develop and improve communication skills related to various roles in organizations.

Purpose
In organizations, it is necessary to communicate with different sub-groups and overcome difficulties in effective communication. Since each sub-group has a unique sub-culture, an effective communications trainer may assist organizational members in improving communications between sub-groups of the organization. It is necessary to ensure that communications between individuals the various sub-cultures serve to meet the mission and goals of the organization. Communications training can assist leaders to develop the ability to perceive how various individuals and subgroups relate to each other and make appropriate interventions

Types of skill development
 Listening skills
 Influence Skills
 Responding to conflict
 Customer service
 Assertiveness skills	
 Negotiation
 Facilitation
 Report writing; business and technical writing
 Public speaking, effective presentation
 Speaking skills 
 Interacting skills

Benefits
Business communication training: It is possible for developing the skills needed for business networking and enhance their communication skills. It helps in communicating the apt message to the appropriate person at the most right time and to effectively manage and develop assertive skills. It enable candidates to manage competently, maintain long-term relationships, form new alliances, meet new people and establish contact with them and develop relationship with them

Corporate communications training: It is useful for corporate events and help in dealing with other corporate participants, besides being helpful for routine dealings.

Executive communication training: It focuses on how to conduct meetings by helping to develop facilitation skills and through exceptional executive communication coaching, candidates learn how to open, manage, as well as end meetings.

Crisis communication training: It enables candidates to communicate while dealing with the various difficulties and emergencies that can arise including conflict management and change management. With training, candidates will be fit to come up with beneficial solutions for solving the crisis or conflict or make change/transition easier.

Public speaking training: It is very useful to make presentations, for developing their verbal communication skills so that it is possible to express their facts publicly with great confidence. This is useful for even sales and marketing personnel who need to express things in the best possible way.

Effective Training

In order to maximize the benefits of instruction, some key points such as management training, identifying your audience, and up to date use of technology can be used to fully profit the managers as well as the members of the organization.
Training for management must be done on a regular basis gives an advantage to any institution since they can provide ongoing feedback to personnel in order to ensure the good function of the different components of an association. Leadership instruction as well as communication skills education are some examples of management training.
Identifying your audience, in this case, the format of the organization such as family business, small business, event, charity group, or simply meetings enables you to apply the required techniques to get the most out of your training and preparation sessions.
As technology grows, its important to keep your preparation up-to-date by using all means necessary. The Internet, computers as well as E-learning provide new insights to effective training and can be adapted to fit different needs for different companies. It's also very important to get constant feedback from the members as well as having assessment strategies to ensure that the training that is being provided is useful and productive to not waste time and resources.

In the medical field, recent research draws on available evidence from general educational literature, as well as specific literature on communication skills training (CST). These studies "delineate how educational interventions should be organized in order to enhance clinicians’ communication skills learning and practice. CST interventions need to be learner- and practice-centered and include core conceptual knowledge and experiential opportunities for practice, reflection, feedback, and rehearsal".

See also
POWERtalk International
Toastmasters International
Association of Speakers Clubs

Notes

Communication skills training